Manitoba Association of Registered Respiratory Therapists is Manitoba's professional and licensing body governed by the Respiratory Therapy Act of Manitoba.

Affiliated groups 
 Canadian Society of Respiratory Therapists
 Canadian Board for Respiratory Therapy
 College of Respiratory Therapists of Ontario

See also 
 American Association for Respiratory Care

References 

Pulmonology and respiratory therapy organizations
Medical associations based in Canada